The elm cultivar Ulmus × hollandica 'Freja' is one of five miniature or bonsai cultivars from the Elegantissima Group raised by the Gartneriet Vestdal nursery in Odense, Denmark.

Description
'Freja' is distinguished by the bright edges to its leaves.

Nurseries

Europe

Gartneriet Vestdal , Odense, Denmark.

Dutch elm cultivar
Ulmus articles missing images
Ulmus